Phytolacca rivinoides, also known by its common name Venezuelan pokeweed, is a species of shrub in the genus Phytolacca.

References

External links
Phytolacca rivinoides Kunth & C.D.Bouché – World Flora Online

rivinoides